is a former Japanese football player. His father is Hajime Moriyasu, a former international football player and the current manager of the Japan national football team. His brother Keigo played as a striker for Edgeworth FC in the National Premier Leagues Northern NSW.

Playing career
Shohei Moriyasu played for J2 League club; Kamatamare Sanuki from 2014 to 2015.

References

External links

1991 births
Living people
Hosei University alumni
Association football people from Hiroshima Prefecture
Japanese footballers
J2 League players
Kamatamare Sanuki players
Association football defenders